The Vrijdagmarkt ("Friday Market") is a city square in the historic centre of Ghent, East Flanders, Belgium. It is named after the weekly tradition to stage a market every Friday morning. As one of the oldest squares in Ghent, it played an important role in the city's history.

Location
With its dimensions of roughly 100 by 100 metres, it is one of the largest public squares in Ghent. Every Friday morning, the square is filled with market stalls; a tradition dating back to 1199. The centerpiece of the plaza is the statue of Jacob van Artevelde, Ghent's wise man who sided with England during the Hundred Years' War and was murdered on the site in 1345.

The square is surrounded with guildhalls, which currently house bars, restaurants and terraces. In the northerly corner, there are two monumental Art Nouveau buildings of the socialist movement, built at the turn of the 20th century, which currently house the socialist health insurance federation and the General Labour Federation of Belgium (ABVV/FGTB).

Underneath the square there is an underground multi-storey car park with a maximum capacity of 648 vehicles.

Panoramic view

References

Squares in Belgium
Buildings and structures in Ghent
World Heritage Sites in Belgium